The Department of Post-Secondary Education, Training and Labour is a department in the Government of New Brunswick.  It is responsible for "ensuring the New Brunswick workforce is competitive by making strategic investments in people through innovative programs, services and partnerships."  It also oversees the province's public universities and colleges, the provincial student loan system, labour and adult learning and literacy.

The department was created as the Department of Post-Secondary Education and Training on February 14, 2006 when Premier Bernard Lord restructured the New Brunswick Cabinet. It was created by merging the former Department of Training and Employment Development with the post-secondary education branch of the Department of Education.  It was renamed the Department of Post-Secondary Education, Training and Labour by Premier Shawn Graham when he took office as organized labour had questioned why there was no "labour" minister.

Between 2017 and 2018 the apartment was administered by two ministers, a Minister of Post-Secondary Education and a Minister of Labour, Employment and Population Growth. Following the 2018 election, in which Blaine Higgs took power, the department returned to being run by a single minister.

Ministers

See also
Department of Post-Secondary Education and Training (New Brunswick)

References

Department of Post-Secondary Education, Training and Labour
Changes to cabinet and departments aimed at helping province achieve new goals

Post-Secondary Education, Training and Labour
New Brunswick
New Brunswick